The women's doubles of the 1998 Skoda Czech Open tournament  was played on clay in Prague, Czech Republic.

Ruxandra Dragomir and Karina Habšudová were the defending champions but they competed with different partners that year, Dragomir with Åsa Carlsson and Habšudová with Silvia Farina.

Carlsson and Dragomir lost in the first round to Cătălina Cristea and Eva Melicharová.

Farina and Habšudová won in the final 2–6, 6–1, 6–2 against Květa Hrdličková and Michaela Paštiková.

Seeds
Champion seeds are indicated in bold text while text in italics indicates the round in which those seeds were eliminated.

 Cătălina Cristea /  Eva Melicharová (quarterfinals)
 Silvia Farina /  Karina Habšudová (champions)
 Olga Lugina /  Helena Vildová (first round)
 Janette Husárová /  Virginia Ruano Pascual (quarterfinals)

Draw

External links
 1998 Skoda Czech Open Doubles draw

1998 - Doubles
Doubles